Howland's Michigan Engineers Company, or the Battle Creek Engineer Corps, was an engineer company that served in the Union Army during the American Civil War.

Service
The company  was organized at Battle Creek, Michigan on September 16, 1861, and mustered into Federal Service on October 9, 1861.  However, when Major General H.W. Halleck took command of the Department of Missouri, he decided that Howland's Company did not meet federal organizational standards.  Upon notification of this fact, the company voted to disband and were subsequently mustered out of Federal Service on January 8, 1862.

Total strength and casualties
Over its existence, the regiment carried a total of 53 men on its muster rolls.

Commanders
Captain Edwin P. Howland

See also
List of Michigan Civil War Units
Michigan in the American Civil War

Notes

References
The Civil War Archive

Engineers
1865 disestablishments in Michigan
Military units and formations disestablished in 1865
1861 establishments in Michigan
Military units and formations established in 1861
Military units and formations disestablished in 1862
Battle Creek, Michigan
Engineer units and formations of the Union Army